William Douglas Stewart (March 26, 1938 - March 2, 2018) was a Liberal party member of the House of Commons of Canada. He was a lawyer by career.

Born at Victoria, British Columbia, Stewart was first elected at the Okanagan—Kootenay riding in the 1968 general election. Stewart was re-elected there in the 1972 election, but did not seek a third term in federal office after completing his term in the 29th Canadian Parliament.

External links
 

1938 births
2018 deaths
Liberal Party of Canada MPs
Members of the House of Commons of Canada from British Columbia
Politicians from Victoria, British Columbia